Great Britain, represented by the British Olympic Association (BOA), competed at the 1928 Summer Olympics in Amsterdam, Netherlands.  British athletes won only three gold medals (down from nine in 1924), and twenty medals overall, finishing eleventh. 232 competitors, 201 men and 31 women, took part in 84 events in 14 sports.

Medallists

Athletics

Boxing

Men's Flyweight (– 50.8 kg)
 Cuthbert Taylor
 First Round — Bye
 Second Round — Defeated Juan José Trillo (ARG), points
 Quarterfinals — Lost to Armand Apell (FRA), points

Men's Lightweight (– 61.2 kg)
 Fred Webster
 First Round — Bye
 Second Round — Lost to David Baan (HOL), points

Men's Light Heavyweight (– 79.4 kg)
 Alfred Jackson
 First Round — Defeated Alfred Cleverley (NZL), points
 Quarterfinals — Lost to Karel Miljon (HOL), points

Men's Heavyweight (+ 79.4 kg)
 Joseph Goyder
 First Round — Lost to Sam Olij (HOL), points

Cycling

12 cyclists, all men, represented Great Britain in 1928.

Individual road race
 Frank Southall
 Jack Lauterwasser
 John Middleton
 Charles Marshall

Team road race
 Frank Southall
 Jack Lauterwasser
 John Middleton
 Charles Marshall

Sprint
 Syd Cozens

Time trial
 Ted Kerridge

Tandem
 Jack Sibbit
 Ernest Chambers

Team pursuit
 Harry Wyld
 Lew Wyld
 Percy Wyld
 George Southall

Diving

Fencing

19 fencers, 16 men and 3 women, represented Great Britain in 1928.

Men's foil
 Thomas Wand-Tetley
 Denis Pearce
 Robert Montgomerie

Men's team foil
 Thomas Wand-Tetley, Robert Montgomerie, Frederick Sherriff, Denis Pearce, Charles Simey, Jack James

Men's épée
 Charles Biscoe
 Bertie Childs
 Martin Holt

Men's team épée
 Charles Biscoe, Bertie Childs, David Drury, Martin Holt

Men's sabre
 Edward Brookfield
 Guy Harry
 Barry Notley

Men's team sabre
 Edward Brookfield, Archie Corble, Alex Forrest, Guy Harry, Robin Jeffreys, Barry Notley

Women's foil
 Muriel Freeman
 Gladys Daniell
 Peggy Butler

Gymnastics

Modern pentathlon

Three male pentathletes represented Great Britain in 1928.

 David Turquand-Young
 Alfred Goodwin
 Lance East

Rowing

 Single scull - David Collet - Bronze
 Double scull - Humphrey Boardman, Denis Guye - Did not start
 Coxless pair - Terence O'Brien, Robert Nisbet -Silver
 Coxless four  John Lander, Michael Warriner, Richard Beesly and Edward Vaughan Bevan - Gold
 Coxed four  Harold Ives, L G Potter, George Beaumont, O B Starkey and  Arthur Sulley - Round 1 - Seventh
 Eight - crew from Thames Rowing Club comprising Jamie Hamilton, Guy Oliver Nickalls, John Badcock, Donald Gollan, Harold Lane, Gordon Killick, Jack Beresford, Harold West and Arthur Sulley

Sailing

Swimming

Water Polo

Weightlifting

Wrestling

Art competitions

References

External links
 

Nations at the 1928 Summer Olympics
1928
Summer Olympics
Summer Olympics